The Perth Glory End of Season Awards are the individual awards won by players of Perth Glory Football Club, an Australian soccer club based in Perth, Western Australia. The club's teams compete in the A-League Men, A-League Women and A-League Youth. These awards are presented annually at the clubs' presentation night following the completion of the A-League Men season.

Mens

Most Glorious Player

Players' Player of the Year

Young Player of the Year

Best Clubman

Bobby Despotovski Golden Boot

Goal of the Year

Supporters' / Members' Players of the Year

Volunteers' Player of the Year

Mens Youth

Naven’s Most Glorious Youth players

Womens

Most Glorious Player

Player's Player of the Year

Golden Boot

References 

Perth Glory FC
Lists of award winners